World Trade Center attack can refer to multiple attacks on the World Trade Center in the U.S. city of New York:
1993 World Trade Center bombings, in which the complex was damaged
September 11 attacks in 2001, in which the complex was destroyed